Bob Vogel may refer to:

 Bob Vogel (born 1941), American football offensive lineman
 Bob Vogel (politician) (born 1951), member of the Minnesota House of Representatives